Miguel Auza is a municipality in the Mexican state of Zacatecas, located approximately  northwest of the state capital of Zacatecas City.

Geography
It borders the Zacatecan municipalities of Juan Aldama to the northeast, Río Grande to the southeast, and Sombrerete to the south. It also borders the municipalities of Cuencamé and Santa Clara in Durango to the northwest and north respectively.

As of 2009, 72% of the land in Miguel Auza is used for agriculture, while the remaining land cover comprises grassland (21%), forest (3%) and matorral (3%). Most of the municipality lies in the endorheic basin of the Aguanaval River and is drained by one of its tributaries, the Santiago River, which originates at the Santiago Reservoir just west of the municipal seat. The southwestern part of the municipality lies in the basin of the Poanas River.

Miguel Auza has a semi-arid climate with dry winters.

History
Prior to the arrival of the Spanish, the area of Miguel Auza was inhabited by the Zacateco people. The expedition of Francisco de Ibarra arrived in the area in 1554, founding the settlement of Real de San Miguel on 29 September. In 1770 it was renamed San Miguel de Mezquital in reference to the abundance of mesquite in the area.

After Zacatecas was admitted into independent Mexico, the municipal council of Miguel Auza was established within the partido and later district of Nieves (nowadays the municipality of General Francisco R. Murguía) on 29 October 1833. It became a free municipality on 19 August 1916. During the Mexican Revolution, Battles were fought in San Miguel in 1912 and in 1915. In 1935, the municipality was renamed in honour of General Miguel Auza Arrenechea (1822–1892), who was born in Sombrerete and fought in the Reform War and at the 1863 Siege of Puebla.

Administration
The municipal government of Miguel Auza comprises a president, a councillor (Spanish: síndico), and thirteen trustees (regidores), eight elected by relative majority and five by proportional representation. The current president of the municipality is José Alfredo González Perales.

Demographics
In the 2010 Mexican Census, the municipality of Miguel Auza recorded a population of 22,296 inhabitants living in 5075 households. The 2015 Intercensal Survey estimated a population of 23,827 inhabitants in Miguel Auza.

INEGI lists 50 localities in the municipality, of which only the municipal seat, also called Miguel Auza, is classified as urban. It recorded a population of 13,551 inhabitants in the 2010 Census.

Economy and infrastructure
Miguel Auza's economy is oriented towards the primary and secondary sectors. The main crops grown are beans and alfalfa, Miguel Auza being located in Mexico's most important bean-growing region. Beef and dairy cattle are the main livestock raised. Miguel Auza also has a facility that processes silver, lead and zinc ore obtained from the Platosa mine in Durango. Federal Highway 49 generally follows the eastern border of Miguel Auza with the municipality of Juan Aldama.

References

Municipalities of Zacatecas
1833 establishments in Mexico
States and territories established in 1833